Siana is a city in Uttar Pradesh, India.

Siana may also refer to:

Syana Tehsil, in Uttar Pradesh, India
Syana (Assembly constituency)
Siana, Rajasthan, a village in Rajasthan, India
Siana, Greece, a settlement in Rhodes, Greece
Siana (given name)

People with the surname
Jolene Siana, American writer

See also 
Siana Cup, a type of Ancient Greek cup
Syana (disambiguation)